Rugging may mean:
Making rugs
Putting a rug on something, e.g. on a horse to keep it warm

See also
Turkish rugging, another name for the plant Chorizanthe staticoides
Rugger (disambiguation)